The 2020–21 Newport County A.F.C. season was the club's eight consecutive season in the EFL League Two. It was Newport's 68th season in the Football League and 100th season of league football overall. Due to the COVID-19 pandemic in the United Kingdom fans were not permitted to attend matches until the League 2 Playoff semi-finals and final.

On 22 September 2020 Newport County beat Championship club Watford 3–1 at home in the third round of the EFL Cup to reach the fourth round for the first time in the club's history. Newport were drawn at home to Premier League club Newcastle United in the fourth round and after drawing 1–1 in normal time Newcastle won the penalty shoot-out. Newport again reached the third round of the 2020–21 FA Cup to face Premier League club Brighton & Hove Albion at home on 10 January 2021. Newport lost to Brighton on penalties having drawn 1–1 after extra time. On 19 January 2021 goalkeeper Tom King scored the first goal of his career with a wind-assisted goal kick in the 12th minute of Newport's 1–1 League Two draw at Cheltenham Town. On 21 January 2021, his goal was confirmed to have broken the Guinness World Record for longest football goal, with a distance of 96.01 metres (105 yards), a record previously held by Asmir Begović. In March 2020 Newport were permitted by the EFL to move two home matches to Cardiff City Stadium due to the poor condition of the Rodney Parade pitch. Newport finished the 2020–21 season in 5th place in League Two and qualified for the play-offs. Newport beat Forest Green Rovers 5–4 on aggregate to reach the play-off final for the second time in three seasons. In the League Two playoff final at Wembley Stadium on 31 May 2021 Newport lost to Morecambe, 1–0 after a controversial 107th-minute penalty.

Transfers

Transfers in

Loans in

Loans out

Transfers out

Pre-season

Competitions

League Two

League table

Result summary

Results by matchday

Matches

The 2020–21 season fixtures were released on 21 August.

Play-offs

FA Cup

The draw for the first round was made on Monday 26 October. The second round draw was revealed on Monday 9 November by Danny Cowley. The third round draw was made on 30 November, with Premier League and EFL Championship clubs all entering the competition.

EFL Cup

The first round draw was made on 18 August, live on Sky Sports, by Paul Merson. The draw for both the second and third round were confirmed on 6 September, live on Sky Sports by Phil Babb. The draw was conducted on 17 September 2020 by Laura Woods and Lee Hendrie live on Sky Sports.

EFL Trophy

The regional group stage draw was confirmed on 18 August 2020.

Welsh League Cup

The draw for the Welsh League Cup sponsored by Nathaniel MG was made on 2 December 2020 with Newport County and Cardiff City invited as wildcard entries. The fixture was postponed and the competition was subsequently cancelled by the Football Association of Wales due to the Coronavirus pandemic.

Squad statistics
Source:

Numbers in parentheses denote appearances as substitute.
Players with squad numbers struck through and marked  left the club during the playing season.
Players with names in italics and marked * were on loan from another club for the whole of their season with Newport County.
Players listed with no appearances have been in the matchday squad but only as unused substitutes.
Key to positions: GK – Goalkeeper; DF – Defender; MF – Midfielder; FW – Forward

|-
!colspan=14|Players who left the club::

|}

Goals record

Disciplinary record

References

 

2020–21
Welsh football clubs 2020–21 season
2020–21 EFL League Two by team